Onni is a male name of Finnish origin meaning "happiness, luck." It was the sixth most popular name for boys in Finland in 2007.

People with the given name Onni 
Onni Hiltunen, Finnish politician
Onni Kasslin, Finnish cyclist
Onni Lappalainen, Finnish gymnast
Onni Okkonen, Finnish art historian
Onni Palaste, Finnish writer
Onni Pellinen, Finnish wrestler
Onni Schildt, Finnish politician
Onni Rajasaari, Finnish athlete
Onni Talas, Finnish politician
Onni Tommila, Finnish child actor

Notes

Given names
Finnish masculine given names